SA Sultan is a Bangladesh Nationalist Party politician and the former Member of Parliament of Chandpur-4.

Career
Sultan was elected to parliament from Chandpur-4 as a Bangladesh Nationalist Party candidate in 2001.

References

Bangladesh Nationalist Party politicians
Living people
8th Jatiya Sangsad members
Year of birth missing (living people)